Renovaré (from the Latin "to renew" or "to restore") is a Christian non-profit organization dedicated to helping individuals and churches engage in "intentional Christian spiritual formation." Renovaré encourages people to develop a balanced vision of Christian faith and witness, which draws on the experience of the whole church - across all denominations, and throughout Christian history - and to develop that into a practical strategy for spiritual growth, drawing on classical religious activities, such as prayer, Bible reading, worship, meditation, fasting, and silence. The ministry is international in scope (with affiliates in the USA, Canada, Britain, Ireland, Korea, and Brazil) and is ecumenical in character; Renovaré's ministry team draws together members of a wide variety of Christian denominations, including Anglican, Baptist, Church of God, Lutheran, Methodist, Roman Catholic, Presbyterian, and Quaker.

History
Renovaré (US) is a nonprofit Christian organization headquartered in Englewood, Colorado, and active worldwide. We seek to resource, fuel, model, and advocate more intentional living and spiritual formation among Christians and those wanting a deeper connection with God. A foundational presence in the spiritual formation movement for over 20 years, Renovaré is Christian in commitment, ecumenical in breadth, and international in scope.
Renovaré was founded by Quaker theologian Richard J. Foster in 1988. After authoring Celebration of Discipline in 1978, Foster was invited to a number of churches and conferences to speak on Christian spiritual formation and spiritual disciplines. He was encouraged by people's interest in the subject, but concerned at an apparent lack of substantive teaching in the area (particularly in Evangelical churches in the USA). In 1986, he withdrew from public ministry to explore how a more systematic and intentional renewal movement might be formed. This led to the foundation of Renovaré in November 1988.

Over the following years, Renovaré held a number of conferences about spiritual formation around the United States. In 1994 the ministry relocated its offices from Friends University in Wichita, Kansas (where Richard had been teaching) to Denver, Colorado. International activities began to emerge in 2002, with the founding of Renovaré Britain and Ireland; this was followed in with the establishment of Renovaré Korea in 2004, and Renovaré Brazil in 2008. In the summer of 2008, Richard Foster retired as President of Renovaré (although remaining a member of the Board and Ministry Team), and Christopher Webb (an Anglican Franciscan, and member of the Board of Renovaré Britain & Ireland) was appointed to the role.

In early 2012 the Renovaré Board "approved the restructuring of the leadership" which resulted in the appointment of Rachel Quan as Executive Director and the termination of the position of President. Christopher Webb returned to Britain and the Board appointed Nathan Foster, Richard's son, as Director of Teaching Ministries.

International Conferences

In addition to hundreds of local and regional conferences around the US, Renovaré has held a series of International Conferences, attended by delegates from around the world:

 1991: Lake Avenue Congregational Church, Pasadena, CA
 1999: George Brown Convention Center, Houston, TX (focusing on Dallas Willard's book The Divine Conspiracy )
 2005: Adams Mark Hotel, Denver, CO (focusing on the Renovaré Spiritual Formation Bible )
 2009: Municipal Auditorium in San Antonio, TX. The conference focused on Eugene Peterson's book The Jesus Way.

References

External links
Renovaré USA official site
Renovaré Canada official site
Renovaré Britain & Ireland official site
Renovaré Korea official site
Renovaré Brazil official site
Christianity Today interview with Richard Foster and Dallas Willard: Part 1 - Renovaré and Discipleship
Christianity Today interview with Richard Foster and Dallas Willard: Part 2 - The Renovaré Study Bible
Video presentation by Richard Foster on the spiritual disciplines
Renovaré Teachings and Practices that Contradict Scripture (PDF), Davis and Davis, 2nd Edition, Feb 2014, posted at whateverispure.org, retrieved Apr 2014.

Christian parachurch organizations
Organizations based in Denver
Christian organizations established in 1988